The Dog It Was That Died is a 1952 detective novel by E.C.R. Lorac, the pen name of the British writer Edith Caroline Rivett. It is the thirty sixth in her long-running series featuring Chief Inspector MacDonald of Scotland Yard, one of the more conventional detectives of the Golden Age of Detective Fiction. It was published by the Collins Crime Club.

Synopsis
When Rodney Bretton, a lecturer in  mathematics, is knocked down and killed by a lorry is it assumed to be a tragic accident. However the drowning of his daughter Wendy in her bath a couple of months later leads MacDonald to launch an investigation.

References

Bibliography
 Cooper, John & Pike, B.A. Artists in Crime: An Illustrated Survey of Crime Fiction First Edition Dustwrappers, 1920-1970. Scolar Press, 1995.
 Hubin, Allen J. Crime Fiction, 1749-1980: A Comprehensive Bibliography. Garland Publishing, 1984.
 Nichols, Victoria & Thompson, Susan. Silk Stalkings: More Women Write of Murder. Scarecrow Press, 1998.
 Reilly, John M. Twentieth Century Crime & Mystery Writers. Springer, 2015.

1952 British novels
British mystery novels
Novels by E.C.R. Lorac
Novels set in England
British detective novels
Collins Crime Club books